Shall We Forgive Her? is a 1917 American silent drama film directed by Arthur Ashley and starring June Elvidge, Arthur Ashley and John Bowers.

Cast
 June Elvidge as Grace Raymond
 Arthur Ashley as Neil Garth
 John Bowers as Oliver West
 Captain Charles as Uncle John
 Richard Collins as Tom
 Arthur Matthews as Dick
 Herbert Barrington as Paul Ellsworth
 George MacQuarrie as James Stapleton
 Katherine Johnston as Nellie West
 Alexandria Carewe as Joan

References

Bibliography
 Langman, Larry. American Film Cycles: The Silent Era. Greenwood Publishing, 1998.

External links
 

1917 films
1917 drama films
1910s English-language films
American silent feature films
Silent American drama films
Films directed by Arthur Ashley
American black-and-white films
World Film Company films
1910s American films